Sok Pheng (born October 20, 1990, in Cambodia) is a footballer for Boeung Ket Angkor in the Cambodian League. He also plays for the Cambodia national team. He plays as a striker.

Club

Phnom Penh Crown
Cambodian League: 2011
2011 AFC President's Cup: Runner up
Boeung Ket FC 
Cambodian League: 2017

References

1990 births
Living people
Cambodian footballers
Cambodia international footballers
Phnom Penh Crown FC players
Boeung Ket Rubber Field players
Association football forwards
Nagaworld FC players